The 1991 NCAA Division I Men's Basketball Championship Game was the finals of the 1991 NCAA Division I men's basketball tournament and it determined the national champion for the 1990–91 NCAA Division I men's basketball season. The 1991 National Title Game was played on April 1, 1991 at the Hoosier Dome in Indianapolis, Indiana. The 1991 National Title Game was played between the 1991 Midwest Regional Champions, #2-seeded Duke and the 1991 Southeast Regional Champions, #3-seeded Kansas.

Participating teams

Kansas Jayhawks

Southeast
Kansas (3) 55, Temple (14) 49
Kansas 77, Pittsburgh (6) 66
Kansas 83, Indiana (2) 65
Kansas 93, Arkansas (1) 81
Final Four
Kansas 79, North Carolina (1) 73

Duke Blue Devils

Midwest
Duke (2) 102, Northeast Louisiana (15) 73
Duke 85, Iowa (7) 70
Duke 87, Connecticut (6) 61
Duke 78, St. John's (4) 61
Final Four
Duke 79, UNLV (1) 77

Starting lineups

Game summary
Source:

References

NCAA Division I Men's Basketball Championship Game
NCAA Division I Men's Basketball Championship Games
Duke Blue Devils men's basketball
Kansas Jayhawks men's basketball
Basketball competitions in Indianapolis
College sports tournaments in Indiana
NCAA Division I Men's Basketball Championship Game
NCAA Division I Basketball Championship Game, 1991
NCAA Division I Basketball Championship Game